Ciner Group (known as Park Holding until December 1994) is an industrial conglomerate in Turkey operating in energy, media, and commerce. Via Ciner Media Group, it owns media properties including the Habertürk newspaper and Habertürk TV. In the energy and mining sector, the company has various coal mines and power plants, and via Eti Soda and Kazan Soda Elektrik, it controls the world's second largest trona (soda ash) reserves. Its Park Elektrik subsidiary is 35% floated on the Istanbul Stock Exchange, as PRKME.

Ciner's asphaltite and lignite mines and power stations are operated via various subsidiaries, including Silopi Elektrik. Ciner is on the Global Coal Exit List.

See also
 Energy policy of Turkey

References

External links
 

 
Coal companies of Turkey
Electric power companies of Turkey
Holding companies established in 1978
Turkish companies established in 1978
Energy companies established in 1978